Bagh City is the chief town and district headquarters of Bagh District, in Azad Kashmir, Pakistan. The town is situated on the confluence of two nullahs (streams), Malwani and Mahl (ماہلوانی اور ماہل) at the distance of 93 km from Muzaffarabad.

2005 earthquake
On 8 October 2005, Bagh was hit by a devastating earthquake that killed 8,500 people, which represented 10% of the population. Most of the victims were children attending school who died when the school buildings collapsed. The worst hit institutes were a school named Spring Field Children academy (where 300 plus children died in junior campus), the boys' degree college and girls' degree college Bagh. Many lives could have been saved if the rescue equipment was available. The entire city was destroyed and was rebuilt with the help of government.

Geography 
Bagh is located 80 kilometres from Muzaffarabad, the capital city of Azad Kashmir. It is 160 kilometres from Islamabad, the capital of Pakistan.

Topographically, the district is quite mountainous with lush green pine forests on the mountain slopes leading into the valleys. The altitude of Bagh Valley is 3405 feet (1038m). Major peaks near Bagh include Kobra Peak.

See also
Kharal Abbasian

References

External links

Bagh Azad Jammu and Kashmir official portal
Alif Ailaan District Education Rankings

Populated places in Bagh District
Tehsils of Bagh District